Blepharoa is a genus of moths of the family Noctuidae.

Selected species
Blepharoa mamestrina (Butler, 1882)

References
Natural History Museum Lepidoptera genus database

Noctuinae